Samantha Hanratty (born September 20, 1995) is an American actress. Her first lead was in 2009, portraying Chrissa Maxwell in An American Girl: Chrissa Stands Strong. In 2011, she played the role Whitney Brown in the film The Greening of Whitney Brown. Hanratty is considered a Celebrity Friend for the Starlight Children's Foundation. Since 2021, she has played the young version of Misty in the Showtime drama series Yellowjackets.

Early life
Samantha Hanratty was born on September 20, 1995, in Scottsdale, Arizona. She attended Laurel Springs School.

Acting career

Hanratty has appeared in several films and television series including the 2006 ABC Family original film Hello Sister, Goodbye Life, opposite Lacey Chabert. In 2006, she was a recurring character through seasons two and three of The Suite Life of Zack & Cody as Holly, a little girl whose father is a con man and once stayed at the Tipton. That same year, she appeared in the ABC film Stephen King's Desperation. From 2006 to 2009, Hanratty had a recurring role on the action-drama series The Unit with her older sister Danielle. In 2006, she appeared in the film The Santa Clause 3: The Escape Clause, playing an elf named Glenda. She also played Chrissa in the 2009 film An American Girl: Chrissa Stands Strong. And in 2018 played a role as Carl's  wife  Kassidi on Showtime's television series Shameless.

Filmography

Film

Television

Awards and nominations

References

External links

 

1995 births
21st-century American actresses
Actresses from Scottsdale, Arizona
American child actresses
American film actresses
American television actresses
Living people
Twitch (service) streamers